The 2013 FIA Alternative Energies Cup is a season of the FIA Alternative Energies Cup, a world championship for vehicles with alternative energy propulsion organized by the Fédération Internationale de l'Automobile.

For the final classifications, 50% rounded up of the best results plus one is taken into account.

Calendar and winners

Driver Standings cat. VII & VIII

Co-Driver Standings cat. VII & VIII

Manufacturer Standings cat. VII & VIII

Driver Standings cat. III

Co-Driver Standings cat. III

Manufacturer Standings cat. VII & VIII

References

FIA E-Rally Regularity Cup seasons
Alternative Energies Cup